"Good Ones" is a 2021 song by Charli XCX.

The Good Ones may refer to:

 The Good Ones (album), a 2021 album by Tebey, or its title track
 "The Good Ones" (Brooklyn Nine-Nine), the opening episode of the eighth season of the American TV series
 "The Good Ones" (Gabby Barrett song), 2020
 "The Good Ones" (Tebey and Marie-Mai song), 2019

See also
 Good One, 2011 comedy album by Tig Notaro